Rancho Calaveras is a census-designated place (CDP) in Calaveras County, California, United States. The population was 5,325 at the 2010 census, up from 4,182 at the 2000 census.

Geography

Climate

Rancho Calaveras has a Csa-Mediterranean climate typical of the Sierra Nevada foothills. Winters are cool and wet with mild days, chilly nights, and substantial rainfall. Summers are hot and dry with very hot days, cool nights, and minimal rainfall. Due to the orographic effect, rainfall in all seasons is significantly greater than on the valley floor to the west.

Demographics

2010
The 2010 United States Census reported that Rancho Calaveras had a population of 5,325. The racial makeup of Rancho Calaveras was 4,645 (87.2%) White, 48 (0.9%) African American, 102 (1.9%) Native American, 87 (1.6%) Asian, 13 (0.2%) Pacific Islander, 195 (3.7%) from other races, and 235 (4.4%) from two or more races. Hispanic or Latino of any race were 670 persons (12.6%).

The Census reported that 5,316 people (99.8% of the population) lived in households, 9 (0.2%) lived in non-institutionalized group quarters, and 0 (0%) were institutionalized.

There were 1,937 households, out of which 680 (35.1%) had children under the age of 18 living in them, 1,275 (65.8%) were opposite-sex married couples living together, 162 (8.4%) had a female householder with no spouse present, 98 (5.1%) had a male householder with no spouse present.  There were 110 (5.7%) unmarried opposite-sex partnerships, and 18 (0.9%) same-sex married couples or partnerships. 301 households (15.5%) were made up of individuals, and 107 (5.5%) had someone living alone who was 65 years of age or older. The average household size was 2.74.  There were 1,535 families (79.2% of all households); the average family size was 3.03.

The population was spread out, with 1,287 people (24.2%) under the age of 18, 337 people (6.3%) aged 18 to 24, 1,148 people (21.6%) aged 25 to 44, 1,845 people (34.6%) aged 45 to 64, and 708 people (13.3%) who were 65 years of age or older.  The median age was 43.6 years. For every 100 females, there were 101.2 males.  For every 100 females age 18 and over, there were 100.9 males.

The homeowner vacancy rate was 3.9%; the rental vacancy rate was 8.2%.  4,519 people (84.9% of the population) lived in owner-occupied housing units and 797 people (15.0%) lived in rental housing units.

2000
As of the census of 2000, there were 4,182 people, 1,470 households, and 1,221 families residing in the CDP. The racial makeup of the CDP was 89.02% White, 0.86% Black or African American, 1.24% Native American, 1.48% Asian, 0.12% Pacific Islander, 2.80% from other races, and 4.47% from two or more races. 10.14% of the population were Hispanic or Latino of any race.

There were 1,470 households, out of which 38.6% had children under the age of 18 living with them, 71.4% were married couples living together, 7.0% had a female householder with no spouse present, and 16.9% were non-families. 12.9% of all households were made up of individuals, and 4.0% had someone living alone who was 65 years of age or older. The average household size was 2.84 and the average family size was 3.09.

In the CDP, the population was spread out, with 28.3% under the age of 18, 5.5% from 18 to 24, 26.9% from 25 to 44, 28.5% from 45 to 64, and 10.9% who were 65 years of age or older. The median age was 40 years. For every 100 females, there were 98.3 males. For every 100 females age 18 and over, there were 101.1 males.

The median income for a household in the CDP was $50,247, and the median income for a family was $53,017. Males had a median income of $50,614 versus $31,280 for females. The per capita income for the CDP was $21,444. About 3.5% of families and 5.8% of the population were below the poverty line, including 8.4% of those under age 18 and 2.2% of those age 65 or over.

Politics

Locally, Rancho Calaveras is represented by Calaveras County Supervisor Darren Spellman who won election November 2, 2010 with 60.1% of Rancho Calaveras voter approval.

References

External links

Census-designated places in Calaveras County, California
Census-designated places in California